Protosteliomycetes/Protosteliales (ICBN) or Protostelea/Protostelia/Protosteliida (ICZN) is a grouping of slime molds from the phylum Mycetozoa. The name can vary depending upon the taxon used. Other names include Protostelea, Protostelia, and Protostelida. When not implying a specific level of classification, the term protostelid or protosteloid amoeba is sometimes used.

Protosteloid amoebae, also called protostelids, are amoebae that are capable of making simple fruiting bodies consisting of a cellular stalk topped by one or a few spores.  All species are microscopic and are typically found on dead plant matter where they consume bacteria, yeasts, and fungal spores. Since protostelids are amoebae that make spores, they are considered to be slime molds.

Classification 
It includes for example the following genera:
 Cavosteliaceae (family)
 Cavostelium (genus)
 Planoprotostelium (genus)
 Ceratiomyxaceae (family)
 Ceratiomyxa (genus)
 Protosteliaceae (family)
 Protostelium (genus)

Taxonomy and relationships
As a subclass, Protostelia has been described as paraphyletic to the protostelid clade, as Protostelia excludes the clade of myxomycetes, which are embedded in the protostelid clade.

The formal taxonomy of protosteloid amoebae groups them all according to fruiting bodies, mostly leaving out characteristics of the amoebae. Recent studies have shown that all protosteloid amoebae studied to date are probably included in the group known as Amoebozoa or Eumycetozoa.  However, protosteloid amoebae are not all closely related and some fall within groups of amoebae in which the other amoebae are nonfruiting.  Therefore, it appears that the ability to make fruiting bodies may have evolved more than once.

Ecology

Protosteloid amoebae are typically found on dead plant matter, including stems and leaves of herbaceous plants, stems and leaves of grasses, bark of living trees, decaying wood and other types of dead plant matter.  Protosteloid amoebae are found on dead plant matter that has fallen on the ground, on dead plant parts that are still hanging in the air and on dead parts of plants that are submerged in a pond.  They have also been detected on the petals of living flowers and on living tree leaves. Since protosteloid amoebae eat bacteria, yeasts, and fungal spores in the laboratory, it is thought that they also do this in nature.  They are thus thought to be predators in the decomposer community.

Distribution
Collections of protostelids have been made from all continents, including the Antarctic peninsula. Protostelids have also been found on isolated islands like Hawaii in the Pacific and Ascension Island in the southern Atlantic, indicating that protostelids have a worldwide distribution. Most studies of protostelid distribution have been done in the temperate zones so they are best known from these areas.
However, tropical studies have turned up protostelids, often in great abundance.

Collection and laboratory culture
Since protosteloid amoebae are microscopic one must bring their substrates, dead plant matter, into the laboratory to find them. Dead plant matter is placed on the agar surface in a petri plate and allowed to incubate for several days to a week. Then the edges of the substrates are scanned with a compound microscope and species are identified by their fruiting body morphology and amoebal morphology.

When protosteloid fruiting bodies are found they can be moved into laboratory culture onto an appropriate food organism or mix of organisms. This is done by picking up fruiting bodies or spores with a sterilised needle and moving them onto agar in a fresh petri plate that has been smeared with a bacterium or yeast upon which the protosteloid amoeba species has been known to grow. If the spores germinate then the protostelid begins eating the food organism and a culture is established.

References

Eumycetozoa
Amoebozoa orders